Brian Normann Kaus (born 5 July 1967 in Denmark) is a Danish retired footballer.

Career

At the age of 17, Kaus debuted for Brønshøj Boldklub in the Danish top flight after scoring 27 goals for the youth team.

In 1992, he signed for newly formed Copenhagen where he peaked as a player, helping them win the league on their first season. Copenhagen went on to become Denmark's most successful club.

In 1993, Kaus made his solitary appearance for the Denmark national team against the United States.

For the second half of 1995/96, he returned to Brønshøj Boldklub, staying there until 2003/04.

Kaus is Brønshøj Boldklub's top appearance-maker of all time, with 250 appearances.

References

External links
 Brian Kaus at National Football Teams

Danish men's footballers
Living people
Association football defenders
1967 births
Danish football managers
Boldklubben 1903 players
F.C. Copenhagen players
Lyngby Boldklub players
Denmark international footballers
Footballers from Copenhagen